, one of the Yaeyama Islands, is the westernmost inhabited island of Japan, lying  from the east coast of Taiwan, between the East China Sea and the Pacific Ocean proper. The island is administered as the town of Yonaguni, Yaeyama Gun, Okinawa, and there are three settlements: Sonai, Kubura, and Higawa.

History
Early human migration from Taiwan to Yonaguni island has long been the subject of scholarly debate. In 2019, a team of Japanese and Taiwanese researchers succeeded in completing the two-day journey from Cape Wushibi in Taitung County to Yonaguni island along the Kuroshio current in a dugout canoe based on technology and materials from 30,000 years ago. Otherwise, the early history of Yonaguni remains vague. The first written record that ever mentions the island is a 1477 Korean document (Chosen Hyōryūmin no Yaeyama kenbunroku), an account of several fishermen from the current Jeju Province who drifted there.

A legendary female leader, San’ai Isoba, is said to have been the ruler of Yonaguni at around the end of the fifteenth century. She is described as a female who possessed superhuman powers that allowed her to protect her people from foreign attacks multiple times, including when the island was attacked by Miyako, another island nearby (Yaeyama). Rituals are still held once a year to worship this mythical figure.

In the 15th century, the island was incorporated into the Ryūkyū Kingdom. By 1879, the island was formally annexed by imperial Japan.

Until the early 20th century, Yonaguni was part of the larger Yaeyama Magiri (village after 1907), which included the neighboring Yaeyama Islands. In 1948, it became an independent village. From 1945 to 1972, it was occupied by the United States and was then returned to Japan to form a part of Okinawa Prefecture.

On 4 May 1998, a part of the island was destroyed by a submarine earthquake.
 
As a result of increased tensions between Japan, China, and Taiwan over the disputed sovereignty of the Japanese-controlled uninhabited Senkaku/Diaoyu/Tiaoyutai Islands which are located roughly 80 nautical miles north-northeast of Yonaguni Island, Japan began construction in 2014 of a coastal monitoring/early warning station with radar and other sensors on Yonaguni to counter a perceived threat from Chinese forces. The initial planned complement of 150 troops include personnel stationed at a physically separate garrison camp located on the outskirts of Yonaguni town. The station's radar became active on 28 March 2016. Separately, a joint (GSDF/ASDF) "mobile aircraft control & warning squadron" is planned to be formed and co-located at the station.

Mythical and cultural references
As the westernmost inhabited island of Japan, Yonaguni has also been constantly associated with the myth of the island of women (Nyōgo no Shima) since the Edo period. As suggested by the name, the island of women is an island where there are only women born and living to support each other. Being a trope frequently used in Edo literary works, it not only appears at the end of The Life of an Amorous Man (好色一代男 Kōshoku Ichidai Otoko, 1682), but also dominates the second part of the five-section Strange Tales of the Crescent Moon (椿説弓張月 Chinsetsu Yumiharizuki, 1807–1811). While the whole second part of the story is about the protagonist Tametomo's time spent on the island of women, which is the westernmost island of Japan according to the tale, the map provided at the beginning of the third section clearly marks the island as 'Yonaguni', assuming the association between the mythical women island and Yonaguni.

During the Taisho period, the Yaeyama islands including Yonaguni gradually came to be explored by people traveling from Japan, as there were ships from Osaka to Yonaguni once a year that introduced outsiders to the islands, who brought their knowledge about Yonaguni back to Japan through many ways, such as writing.

Out of all these early records about Yonaguni, one of the earliest and most influential writings was An expedition to the Southern Islands (Nantō tanken) by Sasamori Gisuke. In Sasamori's research of Yonaguni, the island was notable due to its women: "Women on the island have white skin, and are attentive and thoughtful. It takes only a few pennies for someone who enjoys accompaniment of beautiful women to have one of them in attendance during his stay provide drinks and serve him all night." The statement was confirmed by a later published collection of essays. A folk culture scholar, Motoyama Keisen, asserts that "Yonaguni is the island of women", and continues to quote and agree with Sasamori's account of Yonaguni women, saying that "Surely this was true in 1893, when the author went on his expedition there."

However, a counter-statement is found in a collection of some comical essays by a Taishō novelist and script writer, Murakami Namiroku, in his Collection of Satire Essays (Hiniku Bunshu), and gives a more detailed view of the circumstances of Yonaguni women. One of the essays is titled "Yonaguni" and focuses on the same topic, claiming that "once a man steps on the island, no matter how strong he is, the man would be attacked by women coming from all directions, and hardly ever there could be men who could safely withdraw from there". Furthermore, he describes Yonaguni as an island where, although there are almost only women, for reproductive purposes, there are also a few men: as many as around one-tenth of the women. Curiously, there are only female newborns. Serving as reproductive tools for the women, men are rarely able to live long. Murakami expresses his worries as well at the end, as the women here are all naturally beautiful and potentially they would attract those driven by sexual desire to explore "the hidden paradise".

Nevertheless, these introductory essays aiming to bring an exotic taste are less specific than a quite comprehensive travel log by Yanagita Kunio, who was inspired by Sasamori's work and finally did his own research, An Account of the South Sea (Kainan shōki), published in 1925. A long essay from the collection is titled and devoted to "Yonaguni Women". He provides a detailed written record of their customs and daily life, and writes about how they are busy farming, cooking, and taking care of the kids, with two photographs attached, wearing clothes not so much different from the rest of Japan.

Yonaguni islanders traditionally believed that their island had once been ruled by a goddess named Miruku, who brought fertility to the land. She was ousted by a god named Saku after a flower-growing contest for control over the island, in which Saku stole her flower while she slept. Miruku vanished, and the island's primeval prosperity sank into poverty once she left. The islanders thus held rituals in honor of the goddess in the hope that she might one day return. As late as the 1980s, the highlight of the Yonaguni harvest festival was a procession involving a person in a Miruku mask reenacting the goddess. A nearly identical myth is widespread in Korea.

Geography

Yonaguni, more specifically Cape Irizaki  at the western tip of the island, is the westernmost point of Japan. The island is situated in the middle of the Yonaguni Depression, a relatively deep gap in the Ryukyu arc, where the warm Kuroshio Current enters the East China Sea from the Pacific Ocean.

According to Japanese anthropologist Yousuke Kaifu, the island of Yonaguni can be seen with the naked eye from Taroko Mountain in Taiwan under good weather conditions.

Climate
Yonaguni has a tropical rainforest climate (Köppen climate classification Af). September is the wettest month while July is the driest.

Main sights
Yonaguni is known in Japan for the hanazake, a 120-proof rice-based distilled beverage (awamori) produced only on the island.

The island is also the only natural habitat of a distinctive horse breed, the Yonaguni horse.

Yonaguni's densely forested areas provide a suitable habitat for the Ryukyu atlas moth (A. a. ryukyuensis).

Yonaguni is a destination for divers because of the large numbers of hammerhead sharks that gather in the surrounding waters during winter.

Yonaguni Monument

In 1986, local divers discovered a striking underwater rock formation off the southernmost point of the island. The formation, known popularly as the Yonaguni Monument, has staircase-like terraces with flat sides and sharp corners. Masaaki Kimura, a professor from Okinawa, believes it is an artificial (or artificially modified) structure; however, the majority of academic society regard the rock formation as a natural geologic structure.

Irizaki

Cape Irizaki is the westernmost point of Japan and the place to see the final sunset in Japan.

Agarizaki
Cape Agarizaki is the easternmost cape of Yonaguni. Tourists come here to view the sunrise and to observe scenic views of the ocean at the  cape. Other attractions include the lighthouse and Yonaguni horse.

Southeast coast
 Gunkan-iwa is a rock formation near the shore that looks like a battleship
 Tachigami-iwa (Tatigami-iwa) is a single big rock outstanding offshore
 Sanninudai is a place with step-like slate rock terraces, and offers a viewing point for Gunkan-iwa
 Jinmen-iwa is a big rock in the forest that resembles a human face

Transportation
Yonaguni Airport serves Yonaguni island.

See also

 Geography of Japan
 Japanese Archipelago
 Extreme points of Japan
 Yonaguni language
 Okinawa

References

External links
 
 

Extreme points of Japan
Islands of Okinawa Prefecture
Yaeyama Islands
Yonaguni, Okinawa
Japan Ground Self-Defense Force
Japan Air Self-Defense Force